Ningyuansaurus is a basal oviraptorosaurian dinosaur genus. It contains the single species Ningyuansaurus wangi, known from a fossil specimen from the Early Cretaceous Yixian Formation (Aptian stage, 124.6 Ma ago) of Jianchang, western Liaoning Province, People's Republic of China. It is thought to be the basalmost species of oviraptorosaur, based on its long skull and a greater number of teeth in comparison to any other known oviraptorosaur. The generic name Ningyuansaurus is derived from Ningyuan, an ancient name for Xingcheng City. The specific name honors Wang Qiuwu, the private owner of the specimen who donated it for scientific study. The specimen is now in the Confuciusornis Museum in Xingcheng.

Description
The only known fossil specimen of N. wangi is notable for having a large number of teeth compared to more advanced oviraptorosaurs, but the teeth in the back of the upper jaw (maxilla) are still reduced in number compared to most other non-avialan theropods. The reduced number of maxillary teeth in Ningyuansaurus is shared with the scansoriopterygids and other basal oviraptorosaurs such as Incisivosaurus. Though the skull is poorly preserved, the specimen preserved at least 14 teeth in the lower jaw (dentary) and 10 teeth in the upper jaw, four in the premaxilla and six in the maxilla. The teeth were closely packed together and lacked serrations. The eyes were relatively large. The skull was generally triangular in shape but longer than other basal oviraptorosaurs like Caudipteryx, with a straight lower jaw unlike most other oviraptorosaurs.

The arms were short, with longer upper arms (humeri) than lower arms (ulna). The legs were long, and the upper leg (femur) was longer than the pelvic bones. The tail was relatively long and feather impressions were found near the tip. Additional feather impressions were identified along the neck.

Diet
Numerous small oval-shaped structures were found in the body cavity of the type specimen, each  or less in diameter. These may be the remains of seeds, indicating that N. wangi was at least partially a seed-eater.

See also
 Timeline of oviraptorosaur research

References 
 Q. Ji, J.-c. Lü, X.-f. Wei and X.-r. Wang. 2012. A new oviraptorosaur from the Yixian Formation of Jianching, western Liaoning Province, China. Geological Bulletin of China 31(12):2102-2107

Oviraptorosaurs
Early Cretaceous dinosaurs of Asia
Fossil taxa described in 2012
Feathered dinosaurs
Paleontology in Liaoning